is a former Japanese football player and the currently assistant manager J1 League club of Albirex Niigata.

Playing career
Irie was born in Shizuoka on July 8, 1977. After graduating from high school, he joined Kashiwa Reysol with teammate Tomonori Hirayama in 1996. He debuted in 1998 and played many matches as left defender. However did not play as much in 1999. In 2002, he moved to Vissel Kobe. However he did not play much. In 2003, he moved to Gamba Osaka. He played as left defender and the club won the championship in the 2005 J1 League. He retired at the end of the 2007 season.

Club statistics

References

External links

1977 births
Living people
Association football people from Shizuoka Prefecture
Japanese footballers
J1 League players
Kashiwa Reysol players
Vissel Kobe players
Gamba Osaka players
Association football defenders